Hag Pike is a conspicuous rock column,  high, on the north side of the Wordie Ice Shelf near the west coast of the Antarctic Peninsula. Together with the mountain to the north, it forms the west side of the mouth of Hariot Glacier. Hag Pike was photographed from the air by the British Graham Land Expedition, 1937, and by the Ronne Antarctic Research Expedition, 1947. It was surveyed by the Falkland Islands Dependencies Survey, 1948–50, and 1958. The name by the UK Antarctic Place-Names Committee is descriptive, "hag" being the stump of a tree which remains after felling.

References

Rock formations of Graham Land
Fallières Coast